Baker Abdel Munem (born 1942) was the Palestinian National Authority's official ambassador to Canada. He was born in Ramla during the British Mandate era of Palestine, but fled with his family to Jordan during the 1948 Arab-Israeli War.

Abdel Munem attended Cairo University in 1966, graduating with a BSc in mechanical engineering and served as head of the main electric power station in Jordan for seven years. He returned to Cairo University to continue his studies and obtained his MSc in mechanical engineering in 1975. Abdel Munem served as the vice-president of the International Union of Students from 1978 to 1983 when he obtained his PhD in mechanical engineering from Czechoslovakia. In 1979, he became a member of the Palestine National Council (PNC), and an elected member the Fatah-Revolutionary Council in 1989. In 1985, he earned a PhD in economics from Germany in and a PhD in political science from the United States in 1988.

Abdel Munem's first diplomatic post was the Palestine Liberation Organization's ambassador to Japan in 1983. On July 23, 1995 he was assigned by the PLO to head the newly established Palestine General Delegation to Canada.

Abdel Munem is married to Ghada Abu Laban, has two daughters, Madiha and Kenana and one son, Abdel Munem.

Baker Abdel Munem was born in 1942 in Ramle, Palestine. Only six years later, when the 1948 mass deportation of Palestinians occurred simultaneously with the implementation of the Balfour Declaration, he and his family took refuge in Amman, Jordan.

Between the age of 10 and 15, he worked part-time during the summer as apprentice in a leather and handbags production factory, a jam and juice factory, a perfume and oils factory, a cloths materials shop, and a shoe making shop.

In 1966, Abdel Munem obtained a B.Sc. in mechanical engineering from Cairo University.

During summer vacations in Amman, he attended trainings organized by the Water Department of the Greater Amman Municipality, the Jordan Electric Company, and the Jordan Cement Company.

Abdel Munem then served as Head of the main electric power station in Jordan for seven years.

He then returned to Cairo University in 1973 to continue his studies and obtained in 1975 an M.Sc. in Mechanical Engineering "The Effectiveness of Detergent and Dispersant Types of Oil Additive on the Piston Deposition in a Diesel Engine."

In addition, Abdel Munem has:

1. A PhD in mechanical engineering "Vibrations in Circular Cylindrical Tanks Fully or Partly Filled with Liquid" (Technical University of Brno, Czechoslovakia, 1983);

2. A PhD in economics "The Role of Petroleum from Arab Countries in Helping Solve the Cause of Palestine" (Institute for Economy of Developing Countries, University of Economic Science, Berlin, Germany, 1985);and,

3. A PhD in political science: "The Petroleum Trade Between Japan and the States of the Gulf Cooperation Council (GCC), 1963-1988" (Columbia Pacific University, U.S.A., 1988).

He also holds a General Diploma (1975) and a Special Diploma (1976) in Islamic Studies from the Higher Islamic Studies Institute, Cairo, Egypt.

From 1978 to 1983, he served as the Vice President of the International Union of Students (IUS), representing the General Union of Palestine Students (GUPS).

During this time, he attended several student and youth conferences across the world as the representative of GUPS and IUS. This included the Youth and Students Festival in Havana, Cuba, in 1978, and the meetings of the preparatory committees, held in several countries, preceding the conference.

Dr. Abdel Munem became in 1979 a member of the Palestine National Council (PNC), the Palestine Parliament in exile.

In 1989 he was elected to the Fateh Revolutionary Council.

His first diplomatic posting began in 1983 as the PLO Representative to Japan. He served as the Head of the Permanent General Mission of Palestine in Japan (1983 -1995).

While serving in Japan, Abdel Munem lectured to post-graduate students in the Faculty of International Relations at the International University of Japan in Niigata.

From his experience and knowledge of the Palestinian cause, he authored three books:

1. Palestine in My Heart (Shakaihihyosha, 1991 in Japanese);

2. The PLO and the Gulf War (Daisanshokan, 1991 in Japanese and 1992 in English);and,

3. An Inside Story of the Middle East Peace Conference (Shakaihihyosha, 1993 in Japanese; Al-Shorouk, 1994 in Arabic).

Totally immersed in Japanese cultural life, Dr. Abdel Munem Arabized and edited two additional books:

1. Songs to Hiroshima (Poems) (Al-Shorouk, 1995 in Arabic), and

2. Old Japanese Folk Tales (Al-Shorouk, 1996 in Arabic).

While serving in Japan, Abdel Munem represented Palestine at the various Japanese and international functions held annually in August in Tokyo, Hiroshima and Nagasaki on the anniversary of the Atomic bomb on Hiroshima and Nagasaki.

In 1995, Abdel Munem took up his second posting as the Head of the General Delegation of Palestine in Canada. With fluency in English and Arabic, and being fair in French, he articulated the Palestinian quest for statehood and engaged Canadians in the building of the Palestinian State.

From 1995 to 2004, he was a member of the Palestinian delegation to the annual United Nations Sessions of the General Assembly.

In 2006, Abdel Munem took up his third and final diplomatic posting as the Palestine Ambassador to the Russian Federation.

Throughout his professional career, he participated in several international conferences in the non-aligned countries and others as a member of the Palestinian delegation. He also attended the meetings of many political parties representing Palestine or the Palestine Liberation Organization.

Abdel Munem resides in Amman, Jordan. He is married to Ghada Abu Laban, has two daughters, Madiha and Kenana (both are holders of master's degrees), one son, Abdel Munem (an architect and a holder of Two master's degrees in Architecture from McGill University, Montreal, Canada), and three grandchildren: Thabet, Hamza and Qasem Banat.

Bibliography
Abdel Munem authored several books. 
Palestine in My Heart 1991
The PLO and the Gulf War 1991
An Inside Story of the Middle East Peace Conference 1993
Old Japanese Folk Tales 1995
Songs to Hiroshima (Poems) 1996

References

Palestinian diplomats
Ambassadors of the State of Palestine to Canada
Ambassadors of the State of Palestine to Japan
Ambassadors of the State of Palestine to Russia
People from Ramla
Living people
Fatah members
1942 births
Palestinian expatriates in Jordan
Palestinian expatriates in Germany